Powhatan is a census-designated place in and the county seat of Powhatan County, Virginia, United States. Powhatan was initially known as Scottville (after Revolutionary war hero General Charles Scott), and historically has also been known as Powhatan Court House and Powhatan Courthouse.  It is named after Chief Powhatan, father of Matoaka (Pocahontas).

The first official court of Powhatan was held at Mosby Tavern, the home of Benjamin Mosby and his son, Littleberry Mosby.

Powhatan was established as a community in May 1777, but there were several buildings already in existence at that time.  One of these locations is the Powhatan Plantation which was built in 1735.  The plantation still exists today.

The Shiloh Baptist Church in Powhatan features the mural The Lord Over Jordan by Julien Binford, one of the artist's most famous works.

Notable people 

 Julien Binford – painter
 Tom Miller – Major League Baseball player
 Littleberry Mosby – military officer
 Marvin Banks Perry Jr. – President of Goucher College and Agnes Scott College.

References

External links 

 
 Powhatan Chamber of Commerce

Unincorporated communities in Powhatan County, Virginia
Unincorporated communities in Virginia
County seats in Virginia
Populated places established in 1777
1777 establishments in Virginia